Top Fuel Eliminator is a 1987 video game published by Gamestar.

Gameplay
Top Fuel Eliminator is a game in which the track conditions in the game involve variables such as surface and air temperature, humidity, elevation, and traction.

Reception
David M. Wilson and Johnny L. Wilson reviewed Shirley Muldowney's Top Fuel Challenge with Top Fuel Eliminator for Computer Gaming World, and stated that "Of the two games, one must - note that TFE is more user-friendly. Whereas TFC simply notes the player's failures, TFE offers a full-scale evaluation of every qualifying run."

References

External links
Review in Compute!
Review in Info
Review in Atari Special
Review in Commodore Magazine

1987 video games
Apple II games
Commodore 64 games
Drag racing
Racing video games
Video games developed in the United States